The 1891 West Virginia Mountaineers football team represented West Virginia University in the 1891 college football season. Led by Frederick Lincoln Emory in his first and only year as the Mountaineers' head coach, this was the first West Virginia Mountaineers football team. They lost the only game they played Washington & Jefferson, 72–0, at the Show Lot in Morgantown, West Virginia.

Schedule

Players
The inaugural 1891 roster featured fourteen lettermen.

 Robert F. Bivens, Washington, D.C. – Back
 N. B. Blake, Cox Landing, West Virginia – Guard
 Alpheus Edward Boyd, Uniontown, Pennsylvania – End
 George M. Ford, Masontown, West Virginia – Center
 John "Butch" Hackney, Morgantown, West Virginia
 Gory Hogg, Sewell Station, West Virginia – Quarterback
 John Thomas Holbert, Watson, West Virginia
 Edward Hortman, Tunnelton, West Virginia
 John W. Hughes, Troy, West Virginia – Guard
 Samuel Jenkins, Grafton, West Virginia – Tackle
 George H. A. Kunst, Pruntytown, West Virginia – Guard
 Andrew Price, Marlinton, West Virginia – Tackle
 Andrew Brown Smith, Uniontown, Pennsylvania – End
 William G. Swaney, New Cumberland, West Virginia

References

External links
 Other image

West Virginia
West Virginia Mountaineers football seasons
College football winless seasons
West Virginia Mountaineers football